Santiago Hernández was a Mexican long-distance runner. He competed in the marathon at the 1932 Summer Olympics.

References

Year of birth missing
Year of death missing
Athletes (track and field) at the 1932 Summer Olympics
Mexican male long-distance runners
Mexican male marathon runners
Olympic athletes of Mexico
Place of birth missing
20th-century Mexican people